Alphonse Roy Lejk (February 12, 1911 – July 28, 1995) was an American politician.

Lejk was born in Waumandee, Buffalo County, Wisconsin. He lived in Winona, Minnesota with his wife and family and was an assistant flour blender. Lejk served in the Minnesota House of Representatives from 1949 to 1952.

References

1911 births
1995 deaths
People from Buffalo County, Wisconsin
People from Winona, Minnesota
Members of the Minnesota House of Representatives